The Herat National Museum is a museum located in Herat, Afghanistan. It was established in 1925 by order of Emir Amānullāh.

References

See also 
 List of museums in Afghanistan

Museums in Afghanistan
Buildings and structures in Herat
Museums established in 1925
1925 establishments in Afghanistan